The women's 69 kilograms event at the 2015 World Weightlifting Championships was held on 24–26 November 2015 in Houston, United States.

Schedule

Medalists

Records

 Liu Chunhong's world records were rescinded in 2017.

Results

References

Results 

2015 World Weightlifting Championships
World